Disparctia is a genus of tiger moths in the family Erebidae. The genus was erected by Hervé de Toulgoët in 1978. The moths in the genus are found in the Afrotropics.

Species 
 Disparctia thomensis (Joicey & Talbot, 1926)
 Disparctia varicolor Toulgoët, 1978
 Disparctia vittata (Druce, 1898)

References

 , 1978: Description de nouvelles Arctiides Africaines (Lépidoptères Arctiidae) (3e note). Nouvelle Revue Entomologie 8 (2): 219–230.

External links

Spilosomina
Moth genera